Rigas Feraios is a municipality in the Magnesia regional unit, Thessaly, Greece. The seat of the municipality is the town Velestino. The municipality was named after the Greek writer and revolutionary Rigas Feraios, whose hometown was Velestino.

Municipality
The municipality Rigas Feraios was formed at the 2011 local government reform by the merger of the following 3 former municipalities, that became municipal units:
Feres
Karla
Keramidi

References

Municipalities of Thessaly
Populated places in Magnesia (regional unit)